David Gallant (12 October 1949 – 1997) was an English former footballer who played in the Football League for Darlington.

Gallant was born in Middlesbrough, which was then in the North Riding of Yorkshire. He was playing football for his local youth club in the Whinney Banks area when he was signed Leeds United by Don Revie. Described as a "tall, elegant player", Revie had high hopes for his future. Gallant turned professional with Leeds, but suffered badly with homesickness. After that he left Leeds, returned home and played only in local football. Gallant died in Middlesbrough in 1997.

Notes

References

1949 births
1997 deaths
Footballers from Middlesbrough
English footballers
Association football forwards
Leeds United F.C. players
Darlington F.C. players
English Football League players